Sciurohypnum, or Sciuro-hypnum, is a genus of mosses belonging to the family Brachytheciaceae.

Species
The following species are recognised in the genus Sciurohypnum:
 

Sciurohypnum brotheri 
Sciurohypnum curtum 
Sciurohypnum dovrense 
Sciurohypnum filirepens 
Sciurohypnum flotowianum 
Sciurohypnum fuegianum 
Sciurohypnum glaciale 
Sciurohypnum latifolium 
Sciurohypnum majusculum 
Sciurohypnum oedipodium 
Sciurohypnum ornellanum 
Sciurohypnum plumosum 
Sciurohypnum populeum 
Sciurohypnum printzii 
Sciurohypnum reflexum 
Sciurohypnum starkei 
Sciurohypnum tromsoeense 
Sciurohypnum uematsui 
Sciurohypnum uncinifolium

References

Hypnales
Moss genera